John Baldwin Hawley (February 9, 1831 – May 24, 1895) was an American government official. Born in Connecticut and raised in Illinois, Hawley served in the United States House of Representatives from 1869 to 1875.

Early life
Hawley was born in Hawleyville, Connecticut. He moved with his parents to Carthage, Illinois in 1833. While in Carthage, Hawley attended public school and was later accepted to Jacksonville College in Jacksonville, Illinois. Hawley studied law, and was subsequently admitted to the Illinois bar. He began his legal practice in Rock Island, Illinois.

Career
Hawley was elected Illinois state attorney in 1856 and remained in the position for four years. Hawley enlisted in the Union Army during the Civil War and served as captain of Company H, Forty-Fifth Regiment of Illinois' Volunteer Infantry. He was severely wounded at Fort Donelson. A close friend of President Abraham Lincoln, he was appointed postmaster of Rock Island, Illinois, in 1865, and was removed the year following by President Johnson.

Hawley was elected as a Republican to the forty-first, forty-second, and forty-third Congress. He served as chairman of the Committee on Expenditures on Public Buildings and the Committee on Claims. He was an unsuccessful candidate for renomination in 1874.

From December 6, 1877, until April 1880, when he resigned, Hawley served as the Assistant Secretary of the Treasury.

Later career
He moved to Chicago, Illinois, in 1880 and resumed the practice of law. After moving to Omaha, Nebraska in 1886, Hawley served as an attorney for the western branches of the Northwestern Railroad Company.

Personal life
In 1854, Hawley was married to Mary Fuller Symonds (1835–1908). Together, they were the parents of three daughters Hattie, Clara, and Mary Hawley.

He died in Hot Springs, South Dakota on May 24, 1895. Hawley was interred in Prospect Hill Cemetery, Omaha, Nebraska.

References

External links

John Hawley letter to J. M. Currie, January 14, 1878

1831 births
1895 deaths
Burials at Prospect Hill Cemetery (North Omaha, Nebraska)
Union Army officers
Politicians from Rock Island, Illinois
Republican Party members of the United States House of Representatives from Illinois
19th-century American politicians
Military personnel from Illinois